Pavarotti & Friends for Guatemala and Kosovo is a live album by Italian opera singer Luciano Pavarotti and a variety guest artists, recorded at a benefit concert of the same name held in Parco Novi Sad, Modena, Italy on 1 June 1999. Each track features a different guest artist, usually singing a song they are associated with, in a duet with Pavarotti. The album is part of the Pavarotti & Friends benefit concert series. Among the attendees was 1992 Nobel Peace Prize winner Rigoberta Menchú Tum.

Track listing

Charts

References

Covers albums
Charity albums
1999 live albums
Luciano Pavarotti albums
Benefit concerts